Udea testacea is a moth in the family Crambidae. It was described by Arthur Gardiner Butler in 1879. It is found in Japan, Taiwan and the Philippines.

The wingspan is 16–19 mm.

References

testacea
Moths described in 1879